The 1985 was a noise rock band that existed from 1996 to 2000. The band released two LPs, Nerve Eighty on Progeria Records, and Obscured by Pink Clouds" on Carbon Records, and a handful of singles including a final release on Monoton Studio.

Members have gone on to form Microwaves and Zombi.

Members 
Dan Tomko
Jeff Schreckengost
J Vernet
John Roman
A. E. Paterra

References

External links
 The 1985 on Bandcamp
 The 1985 - BandToBand.com
 The 1985 on last.fm
 Carbon Records

American noise rock music groups